Fowler High School is a high school serving grades 9-12 in Fowler, Michigan, United States. The school is part of the Fowler Public Schools district.

Demographics
The demographic breakdown of the 182 students enrolled for 2021-22 was:
Male - 48.9%
Female - 51.1%
Asian - 1.6%
Black - 0.5%
Hispanic - 2.2%
White - 95.6%

15.4% of the students were eligible for free or reduced-cost lunch. For 2021-22, Fowler was a Title I school.

Athletics 
The Fowler Eagles compete in the Central Michigan Athletic Conference.  The school colors are blue and white.  The following Michigan High School Athletic Association (MHSAA) sanctioned sports are offered:

Baseball (boys)
Basketball (boys and girls)
Boys state champion - 1952
Girls state champion - 1991, 20212022
Bowling (boys and girls)
Cross country (boys and girls)
Boys state champion - 1988, 1989, 1990
Girls state champion - 1988, 1989
Football (boys)
State champion - 1993, 1995, 1996, 1998
Golf (boys)
Softball (girls)
Track and field (boys and girls)
Boys state champion - 1985, 1988
Girls state champion - 1982, 1983, 1989, 1990, 1998, 2011, 2012, 2016, 2018, 2019
Volleyball (girls)
Wrestling (boys)

References

Public high schools in Michigan
Schools in Clinton County, Michigan